Lazo Alavanja (born January 18, 1977 in Schererville, Indiana) is an American soccer midfielder who last played for the Charleston Battery of the USL First Division and the Chicago Storm of the Xtreme Soccer League.  He played professionally both in traditional and indoor soccer, often concurrently.

Youth
Alavanja attended Indiana University, playing on the men’s soccer team from 1995 to 1998.  He was a 1996 and 1997 second team All American and a 1998 first team All American.  In 1997, he played on the U.S. soccer team at the 1997 World University Games.

Professional
In February 1999, the Dallas Burn selected Alavanja with the fourth pick in the 1999 MLS College Draft.  He spent most of the 1999 season on loan with the Project 40 team.  On May 10, 2001, the Burn sent Alavanja to the Miami Fusion in exchange for Miami’s 2002 and 2003 second round SuperDraft picks.   On January 11, 2002, D.C. United took him as the third pick in the 2002 MLS Dispersal Draft.  He played the 2002 season with United.  On May 9, 2003, the Indiana Blast of the USL A-League signed Alavanja.  The Blast released him on June 9, 2003.  In July 2003, he joined the Cincinnati Riverhawks.  On October 14, 2004, the expansion Chicago Storm of the Major Indoor Soccer League signed Alavanja.  He spent two seasons with the Storm, being named to the 2004-2005 MISL All Rookie Team.  He did not play indoors during the 2006-2007 season and on June 5, 2007, the Storm traded his rights to the New Jersey Ironmen in exchange for a second round pick in the 2007 expansion draft.  He played twenty-eight games with the Ironmen during the 2007-2008 indoor season.  In addition to playing the winter indoor seasons, Alavanja signed with the Charleston Battery of the outdoor USL First Division in 2005.  In the fall of 2008, he returned to the Chicago Storm, now playing in the Xtreme Soccer League.

Coach
Alavanja also works as an assistant coach with the University of Illinois Chicago men’s soccer team and besides as head coach of the Sycamore, Illinois based Chicago Soccer Academy.

References

External links
MLS Stats
Charleston Battery

Living people
1977 births
American soccer coaches
Charleston Battery players
Chicago Storm players
Cincinnati Riverhawks players
FC Dallas players
D.C. United players
Association football midfielders
Indiana Blast players
Indiana Hoosiers men's soccer players
Major League Soccer players
Major Indoor Soccer League (2001–2008) players
Miami Fusion players
UIC Flames men's soccer coaches
New Jersey Ironmen players
People from Schererville, Indiana
Soccer players from Indiana
DFW Tornados players
A-League (1995–2004) players
USL First Division players
University of Chicago people
MLS Pro-40 players
FC Dallas draft picks
All-American men's college soccer players
American soccer players